In solid-state physics, the nearly free electron model (or NFE model and quasi-free electron model) is a quantum mechanical model of physical properties of electrons that can move almost freely through the crystal lattice of a solid. The model is closely related to the more conceptual empty lattice approximation. The model enables understanding and calculation of the electronic band structures, especially of metals.

This model is an immediate improvement of the free electron model, in which the metal was considered as a non-interacting electron gas and the ions were neglected completely.

Mathematical formulation

The nearly free electron model is a modification of the free-electron gas model which includes a weak periodic perturbation meant to model the interaction between the conduction electrons and the ions in a crystalline solid.  This model, like the free-electron model, does not take into account electron–electron interactions; that is, the independent electron approximation is still in effect.

As shown by Bloch's theorem, introducing a periodic potential into the Schrödinger equation results in a wave function of the form

where the function  has the same periodicity as the lattice:

(where  is a lattice translation vector.)

Because it is a nearly free electron approximation we can assume that

where  denotes the volume of states of fixed radius  (as described in Gibbs paradox).

A solution of this form can be plugged into the Schrödinger equation, resulting in the central equation:

where the kinetic energy  is given by

if we assume that  is almost constant and 

In any perturbation analysis, one must consider the base case to which the perturbation is applied. In this case the central equation reduces to the form

This identity means that for each , one of the two following cases must hold:

,

In this non-degenerate case, the standard free electron gas result is retrieved:

Non-degenerate and degenerate perturbation theory can be applied in these two cases to solve for the Fourier coefficients  of the wavefunction (correct to first order in ) and the energy eigenvalue (correct to second order in ). An important result of this derivation is that there is no first-order shift in the energy  in the case of no degeneracy, while there is in the case of near-degeneracy, implying that the latter case is more important in this analysis. Particularly, at the Brillouin zone boundary (or, equivalently, at any point on a Bragg plane), one finds a twofold energy degeneracy that results in a shift in energy given by:

Results 

Introducing this weak perturbation has significant effects on the solution to the Schrödinger equation, most significantly resulting in a band gap between wave vectors in different Brillouin zones.

Justifications 

In this model, the assumption is made that the interaction between the conduction electrons and the ion cores can be modeled through the use of a "weak" perturbing potential.  This may seem like a severe approximation, for the Coulomb attraction between these two particles of opposite charge can be quite significant at short distances.  It can be partially justified, however, by noting two important properties of the quantum mechanical system:

The force between the ions and the electrons is greatest at very small distances.  However, the conduction electrons are not "allowed" to get this close to the ion cores due to the Pauli exclusion principle: the orbitals closest to the ion core are already occupied by the core electrons.  Therefore, the conduction electrons never get close enough to the ion cores to feel their full force.
Furthermore, the core electrons shield the ion charge magnitude "seen" by the conduction electrons.  The result is an effective nuclear charge experienced by the conduction electrons which is significantly reduced from the actual nuclear charge.

See also
 Empty lattice approximation
 Electronic band structure
 Tight binding model
 Bloch's theorem
 Kronig–Penney model

References 

Electronic band structures